This is a list of aircraft in alphabetical order beginning with 'P - Ph'.

P - Ph

P&M Aviation
Ace Magic
Mainair Blade
Mainair Rapier
P&M Explorer
P&M GT450
P&M Pulsr
Pegasus Booster
Pegasus Quantum
Pegasus Quik
Solar Wings Ace
Solar Wings Breeze	
Solar Wings Fever		
Solar Wings Rumour
Solar Wings Rush		
Solar Wings Scandal
Solar Wings Storm			
Solar Wings Typhoon 			
Solar Wings Whisper

Paalson 
(Paalson Flygplan)
 Paalson Type 1
 Paalson Type 2

Päätalo
(Raimo Päätalo)
 Päätalo Tiira

PAC 
(Pacific Airmotive Corp (Pres: John W Myers), Burbank, CA)
 PAC Nomad
 PAC Super 18S Tradewind

PAC 
(Pacific Aerospace Corporation)
 Pacific Aerospace Airtrainer
 PAC Cresco
 PAC Fletcher
 PAC 750XL

PAC 
 JF-17 Thunder
 MFI-17 Mushshak
 MFI-395 Super Mushshak
 Hongdu JL-8

PacAero
(PacAero Engineering Corporation)
 Learstar Mark I
 Learstar Mark II

PACE
(Pacific Aerospace Engineering Corporation)
 PACE Gannet

Pacer 
(Pacer Aircraft Co, Perth Amboy, NJ, 1928: New Pacer Aircraft Corp, Main & Grant, Fords, NJ)
 Pacer 1929 Monoplane a.k.a. New Pacer 1929 Monoplane
 Pacer Special a.k.a. New Pacer Special

Pacific 
(Pacific Aeronautical Industries, 3135 Broderick St and 1480 Bush St, San Francisco, CA)
 Pacific A

Pacific 
(Pacific Airplane & Supply Co, Venice, CA)
 Pacific Hawk (1921) twin engine 6-seater biplane
 Pacific-Standard C-1 a.k.a. Rogers C-1

Pack 
(Garland Pack, Nashville, TN / Pack & Associates)
 Pack A
 Pack B
 Pack C
 Pack D
 Pack E

Packard-LePere 
(Packard Motor Car Co, Detroit, MI)
 Packard A
 Packard-LePere LUSAC-11
 Packard-LePere LUSAGH-11
 Packard-LePere LUSAO-11
 Packard-LePere LUSAC-12
 Packard-LePere LUSAC-21
 Packard-LePere LUSAGH-21
 Packard-LePere LUSAC-25

Packard 
(Packard Aircraft Co, Enid, OK)
 Packard 1929 Aeroplane

PADC
(Philippine Aerospace Development Corporation)
 PADC Defiant 300
 PADC Hummingbird

PAF
(Philippines Air Force Research and Development Centre - PAFRDC)
 PAF XT-001 Marko 1
 PAF XT-004 Layang
 PAF Kalabaw 
 PAF Limbas
 PAF Cali

Pagé-Light 
(Victor W Pagé & Oliver Light, Farmingdale, NY)
 Pagé-Light 1909 Biplane

Pagotto Carpenterie
(Pagotto Carpenterie srl, Pianzano, Italy)
 Pagotto Brako
 Pagotto Brakogyro
 Pagotto NAKEd

Paine 
(Sim Paine, Booker, TX)
 Paine Texan

PAL-V
(PAL-V International B.V.)
 PAL-V Liberty

Paladin Industries
(Pennsauken, NJ)
Paladin Golden Eagle
Paladin Hercules
Paladin Sparrow

Pallavicino 
(Cesare Pallavicino)
 Pallavicino PS-1

Palmer 
((Harry A) Palmer Motor Co, Boston, MA)
 Palmer 1931Monoplane

Palmer 
(Pan-American Corp (Fdr: Joe Palmer), San Antonio, TX)
 Palmer 1929 Aeroplane
 Palmer P-3

Palmgren 
(David Palmgren, Wilmington, NC)
 Palmgren 1910 Aeroplane

Palomino 
(Palomino Aircraft Associates aka San Antonio Ave, San Antonio, TX)
 Palomino 1962 Monoplane
 Palomino 1965 Monoplane

PAM 
(Performance Aviation Manufacturing Group)
 PAM 100B Individual Lifting Vehicle
 PAM 100T
 PAM 200
 PAM UAV

Panavia 
(Panavia Aircraft GmbH)
 Panavia Tornado

Panchenko 
(A.N. Panchenko)
 Panchenko ADP-01
 Panchenko ADP-02
 Panchenko ADP-03
 Panchenko ADP-04 Ekranoplan
 Panchenko K-1
 Panchenko K-3
 Panchenko Orpheus 1
 Panchenko Orpheus 2
 Panchenko Orpheus 3
 Panchenko ADP-06

Pancoast 
(Lewis M. Pancoast)
 Pancoast Pelican

Pander
(Pander & Son) / (Nederlandse Fabriek van Vliegtuigen H. Pander & Zonen - Dutch Aircraft Factory H. Pander & Son).
 Pander D
 Pander E
 Pander EG-100
 Pander P.1 "Gypsy Pander"
 Pander P.2 "Gypsy Pander"
 Pander P.3
 Pander Multipro (1932)
 Pander S.4 Postjäger
 Pander PH.1 Zögling (1930)]
 Pander PH.2 Mayer
 Pander-Gipsy
 Pander Supersport

Panha 
 Panha Shabaviz 2-75
 Panha 2091
 Panha Shabviz 2061
 Panha Shahed-278

Panzl 
(Bruce H & Chris J Panzl, Livonia, MI)
 Panzl PAN

Papin-Rouilly
(A. Papin and D. Rouilly)
 Papin-Rouilly Gyroptère

Papoose 
(Rim Kaminskas)
 Papoose RK-1 Jungmeister I

PAR 
(Parks Alumni Racer Consortium, Ferguson, MO)
 PAR Special

Paraavis
(Moscow, Russia)
Paraavis Mirage
Paraavis Pegasus
Paraavis Sova
Paraavis Vityaz

Paraborne
(Kissimmee, FL)
Paraborne Backplane
Paraborne Aviation Buckshot
Paraborne DK Whisper

Paradelta Parma
(Paradelta Parma S.r.L., Parma, Italy)

Paradelta Bamboo
Paradelta Basic
Paradelta Bat Bitch
Paradelta Ben Hur
Paradelta BiBreak
Paradelta Big Bang
Paradelta Billiard
Paradelta Bingo
Paradelta Blaster
Paradelta Blazer
Paradelta Bomber
Paradelta Bora
Paradelta Break
Paradelta Breathless
Paradelta Breeze
Paradelta Breeze Biposto
Paradelta Brio
Paradelta Broken Wind
Paradelta Bull Ball
Paradelta Super Breeze

Paradise
(Paradise Indústria Aeronáutica, Feira de Santana, Brazil)
Paradise Eagle
Paradise P-1 LSA
Paradise P-2
Paradise P-4

Paramania
(Paramania LLC, London, United Kingdom)
Paramania Action
Paramania GTS
Paramania GTX
Paramania Reflex
Paramania Revo
Paramania Rokit
Paramania Vortex

Paramotor
(Oyster Bay, NY)
Paramotor Inc FX1
Paramotor Inc FX2
Paramotor Inc FX3
Paramotor Inc FX4
Paramotor Inc FX5

Paramotor Napedy Paralotniowe
(Warsaw, Poland)
Paramotor Mosquito

Paramotor Performance
(Bandhagen, Sweden)
Paramotor Performance M3

Paramount 
(Paramount Aircraft Corp, Saginaw, MI)
 Paramount Cabinaire 110
 Paramount Cabinaire 165
 Paramount Cabinaire A-70
 Paramount Model 120 Sportster

Parapower
(Pilchowo, Poland)
Parapower Parapower

Parascender
(Parascender Technologies Inc, Kissimmee, FL)
Parascender I
Parascender II
Parascender Para-Ag

Parasport.de
(Schwanewede, Germany)
Parasport.de Action GT
Parasport.de Fun
Parasport.de Ozone Viper

Paratech
(Paratech AG, Appenzell, Switzerland)
Paratech P22
Paratech P12
Paratech P22
Paratech P25
Paratech P26
Paratech P28
Paratech P43
Paratech P45
Paratech P50
Paratech P70
Paratech P81
Paratech P Bi4
Paratech P Bi6

Paratour
(Saint-Chrysostome, Quebec, Canada)
Paratour SD
Paratour Titanium
Paratour Ultratrike
Paratour SD MiniMax
Paratour Green Eagle

Paratrek
(Auburn, CA)
Paratrek Angel 1
Paratrek Angel 2-B
Paratrek Angel 3
Paratrek Angel 4

Parazoom
(Rheine, Germany)
 Parazoom Trio-Star Delta

Parisano 
(Parisano Aerial Navigation Co, 320 West 42 St, New York, NY)
 Parisano Paraplane

Parker 
(Wilford Parker, Utah Aviation Co (aka Utah Aviation Assn), Grantsville, UT)
 Parker 1911 Biplane

Parker 
(William D "Billy" Parker, Ft Collins, CO and San Diecgo, CA)
 Parker Pusher

Parker 
((Fred) Parker Aircraft Co, Perry, IA)
 Parker 1921 Biplane

Parker 
((Willard) Parker Aircraft Corp, Cleveland, OH)
 Parker Pal

Parker 
(Calvin Y "Cal" Parker, Chicago, IL)
 Parker Jeanie's Teenie
 Parker Teenie Two
 Parker Double Teenie
 Parker Tin Wind

Parks 
((Oliver L) Parks Aircraft Div, Parks Air Lines Inc/Parks Air College, East St Louis, IL)
 Parks P-1
 Parks P-1H
 Parks P-1T
 Parks P-1X
 Parks P-2
 Parks P-2A
 Parks P-3 Arrow
 Parks P-4

Parks 
(Robert Parks, Greenville, SC)
 Robert Parks P-1
 Robert Parks P-2
 Robert Parks P-3

Parmelee
(Philip O Parmelee, Matherson, MI)
 Parmelee 1912 Biplane

Parmentier
 Parmentier Wee Mite

Parnall 
 Parnall Scout
 Parnall Perch
 Parnall Pipit
 Parnall Elf
 Parnall Pixie
 Parnall Puffin
 Parnall Possum
 Parnall Perch
 Parnall Pike
 Parnall Imp
 Parnall Prawn
 Parnall Parasol
 Parnall 302
 Parnall 311 
 Parnall 381
 Parnall 382
 Parnall G.4/31
 Parnall Heck
 Parnall Peto
 Parnall Panther
 Parnall Plover
 Parnall 281 Hobo

Parquet 
(Parquet)
 Parquet 1

Parrish Aircraft Xperimental
(Plantation, FL)
Parrish Dart

Parseval
(August von Parseval / LFG)

Parso 
(Harry Parso, San Jose, CA)
 Parso Solo Sport
 Cardoza-Parso PC-1

Parsons-Jocelyn
(Rodney Jocelyn & Lindsey Parsons, Ambler, PA)
 Parsons-Jocelyn D-295
 Parsons-Jocelyn PJ-260

Partenair 
 Partenair Mystere

Partenavia 
 Partenavia P.48 Astore
 Partenavia P.52 Tigrotto
 Partenavia P.53 Aeroscooter
 Partenavia P.55 Tornado
 Partenavia P.57 Fachiro
 Partenavia P.59 Jolly
 Partenavia P.64 Oscar
 Partenavia P.66
 Partenavia P.68
 Partenavia P.70 Alpha
 Partenavia P.86 Mosquito
 Partenavia AP.68TP-300 Spartacus
 Partenavia AP.68TP-600 Viator
 Partenavia P.78

Partridge-Keller 
((Elmer) Partridge-(Henry S) "Pop" Keller, P&K Flying School, Cicero, IL)
 Partridge-Keller#1
 Partridge-Keller Bi-Plane
 Partridge-Keller Tractor Trainer

PAS 
(Pennsylvania Aircraft Syndicate Ltd (Pres: E Burke Wilford), Philadelphia, PA)
 PAS WRK
 PAS XOZ

Paschke 
(Paul & Ted Paschke, Hancock, MN)
 Paschke 1928 Monoplane

Pashinin 
 Pashinin I-21
 Pashinin S-82

Pasotti 
 Pasotti F.6 Airone
 Pasotti F.9 Sparviero
 Pasotti Aviojeep JP.1

Pasped 
(Pasped Aircraft Co (founders: Fred Pastorius, Stanley Pederson), Glendale, CA 1941: Acquired by Skylark Mfg Co, Venice, CA)
 Pasped W-1 Skylark

PAT 
(Piper Advanced Technology Inc (Fdr: Howard "Pug" Piper, son of William T Piper Sr), Wichita, KS)
 PAT-1 Pugmobile

Patchen 
(Marvin Patchen, Ramona, CA)
 Patchen Explorer

Patterson-Francis 
((Charles) Patterson & (Roy N) Francis Aviation Co, San Francisco, CA)
 Patterson-Francis Flying Boat
 Patterson-Francis Twin-Tractor

Pattist 
(M.P. Pattist & Laurens Walraven)
 Pattist-Walraven PW-1

Paul 
(W Luther Paul, Davis, NC)
 Paul 1907 Helicopter

Paul Schmitt
(Ateliers de Constructions Mécaniques et Aéronautiques Paul Schmitt)
 Paul Schmitt 1910 biplane (No.1)
 Paul Schmitt 1910 modified biplane  (No.2?)
 Paul Schmitt No.2
 Paul Schmitt No.3
 Paul Schmitt No.4
 Paul Schmitt No.5
 Paul Schmitt No.6
 Paul Schmitt No.7
 Paul Schmitt Type 1
 Paul Schmitt Type 2
 Paul Schmitt Type 3 (No.9)
 Paul Schmitt Type 4 (Schmitt Bomber Renault - PS.4)
 Paul Schmitt Type 5
 Paul Schmitt Type 6
 Paul Schmitt Type 7 Aerobus
 Paul Schmitt Type 7/4
 Paul Schmitt Type 8
 Paul Schmitt Type 9
 Paul Schmitt Type 10
 Paul Schmitt Type 11
 Paul Schmitt Type 12
 Paul Schmitt Type 13
 Paul Schmitt Type 3 floatplane (PS.3 on floats)
 Paul Schmitt Type 10 floatplane
 Paul Schmitt SBR (Schmitt Bomber Renault - PS.4)
 Paul Schmitt C2

Paulic 
(Rudy & Louis Paulic, Oakland, Burbank and Gardena, CA)
 Paulic XT3-B
 Paulic T4
 Paulic T5

Paulista
see CAP

Paulson
(Albert Paulson, Northwood, ND)
 Paulson Aeronef a.k.a. Gold Bug

Paumier
(Maurice Paumier)
Paumier MP.1
Paumier MP.2 Baladin

Paup
Paup P-Craft

Pause 
(Flugzeugbau Rudolf Pause)
 Pause Mücke

Pawnee
(McCook, NE)
 Pawnee Warrior
 Pawnee Chief

Paxman's Northern Aircraft
(Glenwood, Alberta, Canada)
Paxman Viper

Payen 
(Nicolas Roland Payen)
 Payen AP-10
 Payen AP-12
 Payen Pa 22
 Payen Pa 47 Plein Air
 Payen Pa 49 Katy
 Payen Pa 60
 Payen Pa 61 B Arbalète I
 Payen Pa 61F Arbalète II
 Payen Pa 61G
 Payen Pa 61H
 Payen Pa 610
 Payen Pa 71
 Payen Pa 100
 Payen Pa 101
 Payen Pa 120
 Payen Pa 149

Payne 
(Vernon W Payne, Chicago, IL, 1938: Payne Aircraft Corp, Joliet and Cicero, IL)
 see Knight Twister
 Payne MC-7 Pusher

Pazmany
((Ladislao) Pazmany Aircraft Corporation, San Diego, CA)
 Pazmany PL-1 Laminar
 Pazmany PL-2
 Pazmany PL-4
 Pazmany PL-9 Stork

PBN 
 PBN Defender

PC-Aero
 PC-Aero Elektra One

PC-Flight 
 PC-Flight Pretty Flight

PDQ 
(PDQ Aircraft Products)
 PDQ-2

Peak Aerospace
(Neubrandenburg, Germany)
Peak Aerospace Me 109R

Péan
(Péan de Saint Gilles)
 Péan monoplane

Pearson-Williams 
((C R "Bud") Pearson-(Leland) Williams, Venice, CA)
 Pearson-Williams PW-1

Peck 
(Paul Peck, College Park, MD)
 Peck Columbian

Peed 
(Garland Peed Jr & Florence Patrica Kelley Peed, Santa Monica, CA)
 Peed Biplane

Peel
(Peel Glider Boat Corporation, College Point, Queens, NY / Peel-Zelcer)
 Peel-Zelcer Z-1 glider Boat

Peetermans
(M. Peetermans)
 Peetermans SEA.1
 Peetermans SEA.2

Pegas 2000
(Pegas 2000 sro, Prague, Czech Republic)
Pegas Arcus
Pegas Avis
Pegas Bain
Pegas Bellus
Pegas Certus
Pegas Discus
Pegas Fazole
Pegas One
Pegas Pony
Pegas Power
Pegas Revo

Pegasus 
(Pegasus Aircraft Mfg Co (Anthony A Guarniere & Jack Harris), Maple Heights, OH)
 Pegasus 1931 Monoplane

Pegasus
(Pegasus Aviation)
Pegasus Booster
Pegasus Quantum
Pegasus Quantum 503
Pegasus Quantum Sport
Pegasus Quantum 582
Pegasus Quantum SuperSport
Pegasus Quantum 912
Pegasus Quik
Pegasus Quik 912S Executive
Pegasus QuikR

Pegasus d.o.o.
(Branik, Slovenia)
Pegasus EDA 100 Flamingo

Pegasus
( Pegasus Universal Aerospace)
  Pegasus VBJ

Pegna
(Giovanni Pegna)
 Pegna-Bonmartini Rondine

Peitz 
(Peitz)
 Peitz 101 Avionette

Pelegrin Limited
(Adazi, Latvia)
Pelegrin Tarragon

Pellarini
(Luigi Pellarini)
 Pellarini PL.1
 Pellarini PL.2C Aerauto built by Carrozzeria Colli
 Pellarini PL.3C Aerauto built by Carrozzeria Colli
 Aeronova A.E.R 1
 Aerauto PL.5C
 Aerauto PL.6C
 Fawcett 120 “Illawarra Trainer”
 Kingsford Smith PL.7
 Pellarini Air Jeep
 Bennett PL.9
 Victa R.2
 Bennnett/Waitomo PL-11 Airtruck
 Transavia PL-12 Airtruk
 Pellarini PL.13

Pemberton-Billing 
 Pemberton-Billing P.B.1
 Pemberton-Billing P.B.9
 Pemberton-Billing P.B.23
 Pemberton-Billing P.B.25
 Pemberton-Billing P.B.29E 
 Pemberton-Billing P.B.31 Night Hawk

Peña
(Louis Peña, Dax, France)
 Peña Bilouis
 Peña Capeña
 Peña Dahu
 Peña Joker
 Peña Super Joker

Pénaud 
(Alphonse Pénaud)
 Pénaud-Gauchot Amphibian
 Pénaud tailless Monoplane

Pennec 
(Serge Pennec, Locmaria-Plouzané, France)
 Pennec Gaz'Aile 2

Pensacola 
(Pensacola Metal Aircraft Co, Pensacola, FL)
 Pensacola 1930 Biplane

Pensuti 
(Emilio Pensuti)
 Pensuti 2
 Caproni-Pensuti triplane
 Breda-Pensuti B.2

Pentecost
(Horace T. Pentecost)

 Pentecost HX-1 Hoppi-Copter

Per Il Volo
(Citadella, Italy)
Per Il Volo Miniplane

Percheron
(Maurice Percheron)
 Percheron 18 (no info except a photograph posted in a forum!!!)

Percival 
 Percival Type D Gull
 Percival Type E Mew Gull
 Percival Type K Vega Gull
 Percival Type Q.4
 Percival Type Q.6
 Percival Type Q Petrel
 Percival P.28 Proctor
 Percival P.29 Proctor
 Percival P.30 Proctor
 Percival P.31 Proctor
 Percival P.40 Prentice
 Percival P.46 Youngman-Baynes High Lift
 Percival P.48 Merganser
 Percival P.49 Merganser II
 Percival P.50 Prince
 Percival P.54 Survey Prince
 Percival P.56 Provost
 Percival P.57 Sea Prince
 Percival P.66 Pembroke
 Percival P.66 President
 Percival P.74

Percy
(Graham J. Percy)
 Percy Maya

Perdrix
(Perdrix)
 Perdrix RP.01

Peregrine 
(Peregrine Flight International, Minden, NV)
 Peregrine BD-10

Pereira
(George Pereira / Osprey, Sacramento, CA)

 Pereira X-28A Sea Skimmer
 Pereira GP-2 Osprey I
 Pereira GP-3 Osprey II

Peris
(Jim Peris, Lancaster, PA)
Peris JN-1

Performance Aircraft
(Olathe, KS)
 Performance Aircraft Formula GT
 Performance Aircraft Legend

Perry 
(Thomas O Perry, Chicago, IL, Chicago Helicopters Ltd, Chicago, IL)
 Perry 1923 Helicopter

Perry 
(W Parker Perry, R D No. 6, Trenton, NJ)
 Perry P-1

Perry Beadle 
(Perry, Beadle & Co.)
 Perry Beadle T.1
 Perry Beadle T.2

Personal Flight
(Chelan, WA)
Personal Flight Sky-Bike
Personal Flight Sky-Bike Trike
Personal Flight Sky-Tender

Pescara 
(Raúl Pateras Pescara)
 Pescara Model 1 helicopter
 Pescara Model 2 helicopter
 Pescara Model 2F helicopter
 Pescara Model 3 helicopter
 Pescara Model 4S helicopter

Pescara-Guidoni 
(Raúl Pateras Pescara / Lt. Allessandro Guidoni)
 Pescara-Guidoni Torpedo Seaplane

Peszke
(Grzegorz Peszke)
 Peszke GP5	two-seater, Ultralight aircraft (2005)
 Peszke GP10 Axis	single-seater, glider (2013)
 Peszke GP11 Pulse one-seater, glider
 Peszke GP12 Flex	one-seat, glider
 Peszke GP14 Velo	one-seater, glider

Peters 
((Alva A) Peters Aircraft Co, Salinas, CA)
 Peters AL-1
 Peters Play Plane a.k.a. NABA Sportster

Peterson 
(Peterson's performance Plus / Todd Peterson)
 Peterson 260SE

Peterson 
(David G Peterson, Tulsa, OK)
 Peterson Skyline Super-V

Peterson 
(Pete Peterson, Davenport, IA)
 Peterson Hi-Hopes

Peterson & Campbell 
(Lloyd H Peterson and Mark M Campbell, Los Angeles, CA)
 Peterson & Campbell 1932 Monoplane

Petit 
(George Petit, Harvey, IL)
 Petit Special

Petitbon
 Petitbon RP-40

Petlyakov 
 Petlyakov Pe-2
 Petlyakov Pe-3
 Petlyakov Pe-8
 Petlyakov VI-100
 Petlyakov PB-100

Petróczy-Kármán-Žurovec 
( Major Stephan Petróczy -  Oberleutnant Dr. Theodor von Kármán and Ingenieurleutnant Wilhelm Žurovec)
 Petróczy-Kármán-Žurovec PKZ-1  1917 tethered helicopter (Schraubenfesselflieger)
 Petróczy-Kármán-Žurovec PKZ-2  1917 tethered helicopter (Schraubenfesselflieger)

Petrolini Hermanos 
 Petrolini El Boyero

Peyret 
(Ateliers Peyret / Louis Peyret)http://www.lakesgc.co.uk/mainwebpages/Sailplane%20&%20Glider%201930%20-%201955/volume%204%20No.%206%20Mar%2031%201933.pdf
 Peyret-Abrial A-2 Vautour (Vulture)
 Peyret-Abrial A-5 Rapace
 Peyret Alérion
 Peyret 1923 powered Alérion http://www.flightglobal.com/pdfarchive/view/1923/1923%20-%200215.html
 Peyret Avionette 
 Peyret-Le Prieur seaplane
 Peyret VI Taupin http://www.flightglobal.com/pdfarchive/view/1946/1946%20-%201726.html, Sailplane & Glider 31 Mar 1933 says 8.4m main and 6.5m rear wing spans
 SFCA-Peyret Taupin
 Peyret-Nessler Libellule (with Eric Nessler)

Peyret-Mauboussin
(Louis Peyret et Pierre Mauboussin)
 Peyret-Mauboussin PM X
 Peyret-Mauboussin PM XI
 Peyret-Mauboussin PM XII
 Peyret-Mauboussin PM 110
 Peyret-Mauboussin PM 111

Peyronnenc
(Pierre Peyronnenc)
 Pierre Peyronnenc PP.1

Pfalz 
(Pfalz Flugzeug-Werke G.m.b.H.)
 Pfalz A.I
 Pfalz A.II
 Pfalz C.I
 Pfalz D type
 Pfalz D experimental
 Pfalz D.III
 Pfalz D.IV
 Pfalz D.VI
 Pfalz D.VII
 Pfalz D.VIII
 Pfalz D.XII
 Pfalz D.XIV
 Pfalz D.XV
 Pfalz Dr experimental
 Pfalz Dr.I
 Pfalz Dr.II
 Pfalz E.I
 Pfalz E.II
 Pfalz E.III
 Pfalz E.IV
 Pfalz E.V
 Pfalz E.VI

Pfeifer 
(Joe Pfeifer, St Louis MO. 19??: Burbank CA.)
 Pfeifer JL Sport a.k.a. Special
 Pfeifer Nieuport 11 replica
 Pfeifer Sopwith Snipe replica
 Pfeifer Sport

Pfitzner 
(Alexander Pfitzner)
 Pfitzner Flyer

Phantom 
(Phantom Aeronautics)
 Phantom X1
 Phantom X1E
 Phantom X2
 Phantom I
 Phantom I-E
 Phantom II
 Phantom Classic

Phantom Knight 
(Phantom Knight Aircraft Co, Oak Park, IL)
 Phantom Knight A-150

Phase 3 Aircraft
Phase 3 Eclipse

Pheasant 
(Pheasant Aircraft Co, Fond du Lac, WI)
 Pheasant H-10
 Pheasant Traveler

Phenix Aviation 
 Phenix Aviation Phenix

Philippine Aerospace Development Corporation
 PADC Defiant 300
 PADC Hummingbird

Phillips 
(Lt D B Phillips, San Antonio, TX)
 Phillips Alouette The Fly

Phillips 
(Robert J Phillips, Nutley, NJ)
 Phillips 1930 Monoplane

Phillips 
(Howard A Phillips, Newark, OH)
 Phillips P-2

Phillips 
((James A) Phillips Aviation Co, South Pasadena and Van Nuys, CA)
 Phillips 1-B Aeroneer
 Phillips XPT
 Phillips CT-1 Skylark
 Phillips CT-2 Skylark
 Phillips-Fleet 7

Phillips 
(Peter J. C. Phillips)
 Phillips ST1 Speedtwin
 Phillips ST2 Speedtwin

Phinn 
(Willard J Phinn, Chicago, IL)
 Phinn Arrow B-7

Phönix 
(Phönix Flugzeug-Werke AG)
 Phönix C.I
 Phönix C.II
 Phönix D.I
 Phönix D.II
 Phönix D.IIa
 Phönix D.III
 Phönix D.IV
 Phönix L.2c
 Phönix 21 - (Albatros B.I(Ph.))
 Phönix 22 - (Albatros B.I(Ph.))
 Phönix 23 with Austro-Daimler 160hp (120 kW) engine (Hansa-Brandenburg C.I(Ph.))
 Phönix 24 - (Albatros B.I(Ph.))
 Phönix 25 - (Knoller C.I(Ph.))
 Phönix 26 with Austro-Daimler 160hp (120 kW) engine (Hansa-Brandenburg C.I(Ph.))
 Phönix 26.17 - evaluation of a turret armed 26 series
 Phönix 27 with Austro-Daimler 185hp (140 kW) engine (Hansa-Brandenburg C.I(Ph.))
 Phönix 28 - (Hansa-Brandenburg D.I(Ph.))
 Phönix 29 with Austro-Daimler 210hp (160 kW) engine (Hansa-Brandenburg C.I(Ph.))
 Phönix 29.5 with 150 kW (200 hp) Hiero 6 (Hansa-Brandenburg C.I(Ph.))
 Phönix 121 - (Phönix C.I)
 Phönix 122 - (Phönix D.II)
 Phönix 123 - (UFAG C.I(Ph.))
 Phönix 128 - (Phönix D.I) 
 Phönix 129 with 150 kW (200 hp) Hiero 6 (Hansa-Brandenburg C.I(Ph.))
 Phönix 222 - (Phönix D.II)
 Phönix 222.100 - (D.III)
 Phönix 228 - (Phönix D.I)
 Phönix 229 with 150 kW (200 hp) Hiero 6 (Hansa-Brandenburg C.I(Ph.))
 Phönix 322 - (Phönix D.II)
 Phönix 328 - (Phönix D.I)
 Phönix 329 with 150 kW (200 hp) Hiero 6 (Hansa-Brandenburg C.I(Ph.))
 Phönix 422 - (Phönix D.IIa)
 Phönix 422.23 - 1918 Fighter Evaluation Trials prototype
 Phönix 429 with 170 kW (230 hp) Hiero 6 (Hansa-Brandenburg C.I(Ph.))
 Phönix 350hp biplane
 Phönix Monoplane
 Phönix Type 13 reconnaissance biplane
 Phönix rotary engined fighter
 Phönix rotary engined parasol fighter
 Phönix 20.01 - (originally ÖAlb.01)
 Phönix 20.02 - (Albatrros B.I(Ph.))(Hiero 200 hp inverted V-8, later 300 hp Austro-Daimler V-12)
 Phönix 20.03 - (Albatrros B.I(Ph.))
 Phönix 20.04 - (Albatrros B.I(Ph.))
 Phönix 20.05 - (Albatrros B.I(Ph.))
 Phönix 20.06 - (Albatrros B.I(Ph.))
 Phönix 20.07 - (Albatrros B.I(Ph.))
 Phönix 20.08 - (Hansa-Brandenburg C.I(Ph.))
 Phönix 20.09 - (Hansa-Brandenburg C.I(Ph.))
 Phönix 20.10 - twin engined Kampfflugzeug
 Phönix 20.11 - Own design triplane bomber prototype cancelled during construction
 Phönix 20.12 - Own design triplane bomber prototype cancelled during construction
 Phönix 20.13 - (Hansa-Brandenburg C.I(Ph.) 29.90) with 220 hp Benz engine
 Phönix 20.14 - (Hansa-Brandenburg D.I(Ph.) 28.48)
 Phönix 20.15
 Phönix 20.16 - (Phönix D.I)
 Phönix 20.17
 Phönix 20.18 - production as (Phönix D.II) & (D.IIa) became Phönix D.III with the Navy
 Phönix 20.19
 Phönix 20.20
 Phönix 20.21 - (Hansa-Brandenburg C.I(Ph.)) with widened and shallower fuselage to accommodate a camera
 Phönix 20.22 - 1918 Fighter Evaluation Trials prototype - (Phönix D.II)/(D.IIa)
 Phönix 20.23 - 1918 Fighter Evaluation Trials prototype - (Phönix D.II)/(D.IIa)
 Phönix 20.24 - 1918 Fighter Evaluation Trials prototype
 Phönix 20.25 - 1918 Fighter Evaluation Trials prototype
 Phönix 20.28
 Phönix 20.29

Phoenix Air
(Phoenix Air (aircraft manufacturer), Czech Republic)
 Phoenix Air Phoenix

Phoenix Aircraft
(Munich, Germany)
Phoenix Aircraft Maverick PA

Phoenix
(Phoenix Aircraft Ltd., Cranleigh, Surrey, United Kingdom)
 Phoenix P.A.4a Minor
 Phoenix P.A.5a Major

Phoenix
(Phoenix-Flugzeugwerft GmbH / Oesterreichische Phoenix-Flugzeugwerft GmbH)
 Phoenix Meteor L1 
 Phoenix Meteor L2
 Phoenix LF4

Phoenix 
(Phoenix Aircraft Corp (Pres: Joseph Klaus), 601 25th St, Milwaukee, WI)
 Phoenix H-2

Phoenix 
(Phoenix Dynamo Manufacturing Company)
 Phoenix P.5 Cork

Phoenix Gleitschirmantriebe
(Würselen, Germany)
Phoenix Skywalker

Phoenix Industries
(Phoenix Industries, Inc, Southampton, NJ)
Phoenix Industries B1Z ParaFlyer
Phoenix Industries CV1 ParaFlyer
Phoenix Industries TZ-1 ParaFlyer
Phoenix Industries Sport

Phoenix Rotorcraft
(Fallston, MD and Louisburg, NC)
Phoenix Skyblazer

References

Further reading

External links

 List of aircraft (P - Ph)